Goraghatta is a village in the taluk of Nelamangala in Bangalore Rural District of Karnataka State, India. Goraghatta rests on the border between Nelmangala and Doddaballapura.

Offices 
 Village Accountant Office, Goraghatta
 Govt Higher Primary School, Goraghatta
 Goraghatta Milk Producers Co-operative Society Limited

References

External links 
 https://bangalorerural.nic.in/en/

Villages in Bangalore Rural district